Mathew Knowles & Music World Present Vol.1: Love Destiny is a compilation album released by R&B group Destiny's Child. This album was only released in Japan at the end of June 2008 to commemorate the tenth anniversary of the group. It consists of a few songs the group and three songs from singer Solange Knowles, member Beyoncé's younger sister, who is not part of the group. There are also two bonus tracks from Lady Lux and Lyfe Jennings.

Track listing

Charts

References 

2005 compilation albums
Destiny's Child albums